Juan de Ayolas (died c. 1537) was a conquistador born in Briviesca who explored the watershed of the Río de la Plata for the Spanish Crown. He accompanied Pedro de Mendoza on his 1534 expedition to colonize the region between the Río de la Plata and the Strait of Magellan and briefly succeeded him as the second governor of the region after Mendoza returned home in 1537.

Seeking supplies, he sailed up the Paraná River and founded a fort called Corpus Christi, as Sebastian Cabot had before him. Leaving Domingo Martínez de Irala at Puerto la Candelaria (modern Fuerte Olimpo), he sailed up the Paraguay River seeking a connection to Peru. He fought with the Guaraní, crossed the Chaco to the Andes, and seized some loot there, but when he returned, he was killed with every man of his company by the Payagua.

The city of Ayolas in Paraguay, and its airport (IATA: AYO; ICAO: SGAY) are named for him.

Sources
Britannica Online Encyclopedia

MAURA, Juan Francisco. Alvar Núñez Cabeza de Vaca: el gran burlador de América. Parnaseo/Lemir. Valencia: Universidad de Valencia, 2008.

Spanish conquistadors
Explorers of Argentina
Explorers of South America
Year of birth unknown
15th-century births
1537 deaths
People from the Province of Burgos
Castilian conquistadors
Castilian-Leonese conquistadors
16th century in the Viceroyalty of Peru
16th-century explorers
16th-century Spanish people